Boutroux is a surname. Notable people with the surname include:

Émile Boutroux (1845–1921), French philosopher of science and religion
Pierre Boutroux (1880–1922), French mathematician and historian of science, son of Émile

French-language surnames